Partners (also known as Partners Trouble Ho Gayi Double) is an Indian buddy cop-comedy series. The series was produced by Paritosh Painter. The show premiered on SAB TV on 28 November 2017.

Plot 
Aditya Dev (Vipul Roy) and Manav A Desai (Kiku Sharda) are two policemen who work under Commissioner Gogol Chatterjee (Johnny Lever). They are very different in nature but slowly start to become good friends but they again turn against each other with both of them fighting over Chamko who cunningly manipulates situations to her advantage and plays them against each other to the point that they again start to resent the presence of each other. Dev falls in love with Ayesha Nadkarni (Kishwer Merchant), who is a lawyer and Desai is in love with Ayesha's younger sister Dolly Nadkarni (Shweta Gulati). They both live with Neena Nadkarni (Ashwini Kalsekar), their mother, a widow, and an old friend of Chatterjee. The story revolves around these characters and the different cases the policemen solve, with a focus on the comedic and entertaining situations which ensue. Later both men fight for Gogol's niece, Chamko (Neha Pendse). Champko is very cunning and manipulative. Aditya who is apparently a well-sorted individual and an exceptional officer fails to see through Champko's tricks and falls for her leading him to start resenting having to partner with Manav as he did initially.

Cast

Main 
Johnny Lever as 
 Commissioner Gogol Chatterjee, Neena's love interest and Khogol and Phogol's twin brother (2017–2018)
 Khabri Khogol Chatterjee, police informer and Gogol and Phogol's twin brother Shanno's love interest (2017–2018)
 Commissioner Phogol Chatterjee, Gogol and Khogol's twin brother (2018) 
Vipul Roy as Senior Inspector Aditya Dev, Ayesha and Chamko's love interest (2017–2018)
Kiku Sharda as Senior Inspector Manav A. Desai, Dolly and Sundari's love interest  (2017–2018)
Kishwer Merchant as Ayesha Nadkarni, Aditya's love interest (2017–2018)
Shweta Gulati as Dolly Nadkarni, Manav's love interest (2017-2018)
Ashwini Kalsekar as Neena Nadkarni, Ayesha and Dolly's mother, Gogol's love interest (2017-2018)
Neha Pendse as Chamko, Gogol's niece. (2018)

Recurring 
 Mahira Sharma as Sonia, Daughter of a dreaded Don
 Jayesh Thakkar as Sub Inspector P. K. Bose
 Asrani as Director General of Police Jagmohan Chhabria, Manav's brother-in-law
 Sulbha Jadhav as Constable Sundari
 Delnaaz Irani as Shanno
 Yashkant Sharma as Constable Deepakkumar Imartilal Gopla a.k.a. DIG
Deepak as various characters

Cameos 
Chetan Hansraj as Manjeet Singh
Shreyas Talpade as Himself
Manini Mishra as Sushmita
Vindhya Tiwari as Shagun
Karan Thakur (actor) as Rahul
Balwinder Singh Suri as Shonty Chadda, the secretary of Mayur Society/ Mr.P
 Melanie Pais as Reema as Sports teacher
 Tushar Kapadia as Ramu Joshi
Suyyash Rai as Raju Hatela
Umesh Bajpai as Mr.Kuteja
Barkha Sengupta as Shikha
Vrajesh Hirjee as Nagesh
Tanaaz Irani as Kiara
Mahira Sharma as Sonia
Abhishek Sharma as Varun Malhotra and Briganza
Pawan Singh as Birbal
Romit Raj as Vikram
Nasirr Khan as Sanki Pathan
Resham Tipnis as Bulbul
Sanjay Narvekar as Chhota Bunty
Ayub Khan as Don Harsh Singhania
Ram Awana as Jagga

See also 
 List of Hindi comedy shows

References

External links 

 Partners on IMDb

Hindi comedy shows
2017 Indian television series debuts
Indian comedy television series
Sony SAB original programming
Fictional portrayals of police departments in India
2018 Indian television series endings